The Cayman Islands competed at the 2020 Summer Olympics in Tokyo. Originally scheduled to take place from 24 July to 9 August 2020, the Games were postponed to 23 July to 8 August 2021, because of the COVID-19 pandemic. It is the nation's eleventh appearance at the Summer Olympics.

Competitors
The following is the list of number of competitors participating in the Games:

Athletics

Caymanian athletes achieved the entry standards, either by qualifying time or by world ranking, in the following track and field events (up to a maximum of 3 athletes in each event):

Track & road events

Gymnastics

Artistic
The Cayman Islands received an invitation from the Tripartite Commission to send a female gymnast to the Games, signifying the nation's Olympic debut in the sport.

Women

Swimming

Cayman Islands received a universality invitation from FINA to send two top-ranked swimmers (one per gender) in their respective individual events to the Olympics, based on the FINA Points System of June 28, 2021.

See also
Cayman Islands at the 2019 Pan American Games

References

Nations at the 2020 Summer Olympics
2020
2020 in Caymanian sport